Qualitas Career Academy is a private college in South Africa, with campuses in various provinces. The institution delivers attendance/contact-based tuition in two modalities, namely full-time and part-time. Full-time curriculum is aimed at high school graduates/students acquiring their first qualification.  The part-time curriculum centres on skills and knowledge required by those already employed. Training and consultation services are presented to the private and government sector.

History

The organization was founded in 1998. In 2008, its academic division, the "Hair Academy" piloted hairdressing training and hairdressing apprenticeships, and set up smaller campuses in South Africa in 2010. In 2012 additional academic divisions were added.

Faculties
 Business & Technology Academy
 Hair Academy
 Health Academy
 School of Architectural Draughtsmanship and Construction
 Wellness Academy

Accreditation
In South Africa, an institute providing private education is required to be accredited. This accreditation should be specific to the institution, site of delivery as well as the actual qualification or part qualification offered. Qualitas Career Academy holds accreditation with the following South African Organisations regulated by acts of parliament that govern education.
 UMALUSI: The Quality Council for General and Further Education & Training 
 SSETA: Services Sectoral Education & Training Authority.
 MICT SETA: Media and Information & Communication Technologies Sectoral Education & Training Authority.

International accreditation / affiliations
Various organisations with influence in specialised fields of learning also endorse, examine and/or co-certify certain qualifications or part-qualifications.

 City and Guilds
 ICDL: International Computer Driving Licence 
 ITEC: International Therapy Examination Council

References

Education in South Africa
Vocational education in South Africa
Colleges in South Africa
Education in Gauteng
Education in Bloemfontein
Education in Cape Town
2008 establishments in South Africa
Educational institutions established in 2008